Edward James Davey (29 August 1897 – 6 November 1980) was an Australian rules footballer who played with Richmond in the Victorian Football League (VFL).

Notes

External links 

1897 births
1980 deaths
Australian rules footballers from Melbourne
Richmond Football Club players
People from Richmond, Victoria